Fritz Hollenbeck (23 October 1929 – 2 June 2021) was a German actor, primarily of television. His best known work is the title role in the television series Uncle Bräsig between 1978 and 1980. He married the actress Rotraud Conrad.

Selected filmography
 Hamburg Transit (1971, TV series)
 Bauern, Bonzen und Bomben (1973, TV series)
  (1975)
 Uncle Bräsig (1978-1980, TV series)
 Helga und die Nordlichter (1984, TV series)
 The Country Doctor (1987-2001, TV series)

References

Bibliography
 Jovan Evermann. Der Serien-Guide: M-S. Schwarzkopf & Schwarzkopf, 1999.

External links

1929 births
2021 deaths
German male television actors
People from Lübz